The 1999 Nokia Cup was a WTA Tier IV tournament held in Prostějov, Czech Republic, and the only edition of the Nokia Cup. Frenchwomen Alexandra Fusai and Nathalie Tauziat won in the final 3–6, 6–2, 6–1 against home competitors Květa Hrdličková and Helena Vildová.

Seeds

Draw

External links
 1999 Nokia Cup Doubles draw

Nokia Cup
Nokia Cup